Chesterfield was a Rural District in Derbyshire, England from 1894 to 1974. It was created under the Local Government Act 1894.

The district was abolished in 1974 under the Local Government Act 1972 and combined with Clay Cross Urban District and Dronfield Urban District to form the new North East Derbyshire district, except Brimington which was incorporated into the Chesterfield borough.

References
Vision of Britain Chesterfield Rural District

Districts of England created by the Local Government Act 1894
Districts of England abolished by the Local Government Act 1972
History of Derbyshire
Rural districts of England